is a town located in Sorachi Subprefecture, Hokkaido, Japan.

As of September 2016, the town has an estimated population of 2,546, and a density of 13.3 persons per km2.

Etymology
The name of the town is from the Ainu language, but the origin of name has been lost. Urir-o-pet, one possibility, means "cormorant river".

In Japanese, the name of the town is written with ateji, or kanji characters used to phonetically represent native or borrowed words. The first, means "rain", and the second, means "dragon".

Neighboring municipalities 
 Sorachi Subprefecture
 Takikawa
 Hokuryū
 Moseushi
 Shintotsukawa
 Rumoi Subprefecture
 Mashike

References

External links

Official Website 

Towns in Hokkaido